This is a list of the ministries, in the sense of successive governments, of the Kingdom of England before its Union with the Kingdom of Scotland in 1707.


Ministries of Charles II and James II: 1660–1688
Clarendon ministry (1660–1668)
Cabal ministry (1668–1674)
First Danby ministry (1674–1679)
Privy Council ministry (1679)
Ministry of the Chits (1679–1688)

Ministries of William III and Mary II: 1689–1694
Carmarthen–Halifax ministry (1689–1690)
Carmarthen ministry (1690–1694)

Ministries of William III: 1694–1702
First Whig Junto (1694–1699)
Pembroke ministry (1699–1702)

Ministries of Anne: 1702–1707
Godolphin–Marlborough ministry (1702–1708) (continued in the new Kingdom of Great Britain)

See also
List of British governments
List of English chief ministers

Ministries